The Basilica of the Immaculate Conception is a historic Catholic church in Downtown Jacksonville, Florida, U.S. A parish church in the Diocese of St. Augustine, it represents Jacksonville's oldest Catholic congregation. The current building, dating to 1910, was added to the U.S. National Register of Historic Places in 1992 as the Church of the Immaculate Conception, and was named a minor basilica in 2013. It is located at 121 East Duval Street; its current pastor is Very Reverend Blair Gaynes.

History

The congregation was established in about 1845 as a mission of the Catholic parish of Savannah in Georgia, and the first church building was constructed by 1847. Immaculate Conception was designated its own parish in 1854, but the original building was destroyed by Union forces during the American Civil War. A second building was planned shortly after Jacksonville became part of the newly created Catholic Diocese of St. Augustine in 1870, and was completed in 1874. This was destroyed along with most of downtown Jacksonville in the Great Fire of 1901.

The current building was designed in 1905 by architect M. H. Hubbard, also the designer of Bethel Baptist Institutional Church. Construction began in 1907 and completed on December 8, 1910, when the building was dedicated. The structure is an example of Late Gothic Revival architecture, considered one of the best such examples in Florida, featuring a cruciform floor plan, pointed arches, tracery on the windows, buttresses and pinnacles, high spires, and a high vault on the interior. The building's  steeple, topped by a gold-plated cross, was the highest point in the city for three years until the Heard National Bank Building was finished in 1913.

In 1979, the church received solemn dedication, meaning the structure cannot be demolished willfully or converted to another purpose besides a church. On December 30, 1992, it was listed in the U.S. National Register of Historic Places. Beginning in 2005 the church sought designation as a minor basilica from the Congregation for Divine Worship and the Discipline of the Sacraments due to its history. The request was renewed in 2013 by Bishop Felipe de Jesús Estévez and granted; the designation was announced on August 15, 2013.

References

External links
 Official website
 Florida's Office of Cultural and Historical Programs
 Duval County listings

Basilica churches in Florida
Roman Catholic Diocese of Saint Augustine
Churches in Jacksonville, Florida
History of Jacksonville, Florida
National Register of Historic Places in Jacksonville, Florida
Churches on the National Register of Historic Places in Florida
Downtown Jacksonville
1845 establishments in Florida
Roman Catholic churches completed in 1910
20th-century Roman Catholic church buildings in the United States